"Goosebumps" (stylized in all lowercase) is a song by American rapper Travis Scott featuring fellow American rapper Kendrick Lamar. It was sent to rhythmic radio on December 13, 2016, by Grand Hustle Records and Epic Records as the third single from Scott's second studio album, Birds in the Trap Sing McKnight.

Scott broke a Guinness World Record in 2017 for the most consecutive performances of a song during a show after he performed "Goosebumps" 15 times in a row. Spanish DJ and producer Hvme (pronounced "hume") released a reworked deep house version of the song in mid-2020, accruing millions of streams. However, it was only officially released with Scott's approval on January 15, 2021. The remix debuted at number 85 and later peaked at number 47 on the Billboard Hot 100. It also peaked at number one on the Billboard Hot Dance/Electronic Songs Chart.

The soundtrack for the 2018 film The Hate U Give featured the song.

Background
During an interview with Billboard, Scott explained how he came into contact with Lamar for "Goosebumps":

The music video was released on April 3, 2017. It was directed by BRTHR, who also directed a similar music video for The Weeknd's "Party Monster".

Chart performance
"Goosebumps" debuted at number 92 on the US Billboard Hot 100 for the week of September 24, 2016. The song then re-entered the chart several times and peaked at number 32, becoming his third top 40 hit. In January 2017, the song was certified Gold by the Recording Industry Association of America (RIAA) for sales of over 500,000 equivalent-units in the United States. On March 28, 2017, Scott announced that the song had been certified Platinum.

Live performances
On January 21, 2017, Scott performed "Goosebumps" on Jimmy Kimmel Live.

Charts

Weekly charts

Year-end charts

Certifications

HVME version

A cover of the track by Spanish DJ HVME (pronounced "hume") was released on June 12, 2020. The official music video premiered days later, on June 18, 2020; through record label Lithuania HQ's YouTube channel. The cover version managed to chart in several European countries as Italy, Germany and the Netherlands.

Charts

Weekly charts

Year-end charts

Certifications

Travis Scott and HVME remix

Due to its success and rising popularity, the HVME cover was officially released with Scott's approval on January 15, 2021. The remix debuted at number 85 and later peaked at number 47 on the Billboard Hot 100. It also peaked at number one on the Billboard Hot Dance/Electronic Songs Chart.

Charts

Weekly charts

Year-end charts

Certifications

Radio and release history

References

2016 songs
2016 singles
2021 singles
Grand Hustle Records singles
Epic Records singles
Songs written by Travis Scott
Travis Scott songs
Kendrick Lamar songs
Number-one singles in Russia
Songs written by Kendrick Lamar
Songs written by Mike Dean (record producer)
Song recordings produced by Cardo (record producer)
Song recordings produced by Cubeatz
Songs written by Kevin Gomringer
Songs written by Tim Gomringer
Songs written by Cardo (record producer)
Deep house songs
Song recordings produced by Mike Dean (record producer)